Lower Barney's River (2012 population: 250) is a small community in the Canadian province of Nova Scotia, located in Pictou County. Lower Barney's River is named after being the lower part of the large river called "Barney's River".

Navigator

References
Lower Barney's River on Destination Nova Scotia

Communities in Pictou County
General Service Areas in Nova Scotia